North Carolina Highway 740 is a primary state highway in the U.S. state of North Carolina.  The southern terminus is in Albemarle, from which it runs northeast into the town of Badin, then turns northwest to terminate in New London.  The entire  route lies within Stanly County.

Route description

NC 740 is a two-lane rural highway; starting in Albemarle, it goes northeast to the factory town of Badin.  NC 740 through Badin is decorated with many town banners and street lights; most of the stoplights are found on the street corners rather than suspended from overhead wires.  After it goes through the town, NC 740 skirts along the banks of Badin Lake before going northwest to New London, where it ends.

History 
Established around 1930 as a spur of NC 74 (renumbered NC 73 in 1934), it connected Albemarle to the town of Badin then back to New London, ending at NC 80 (current NC 8).  In 1933, it was extended north, replacing some of NC 62; but then reverted to original terminus in 1935, replaced by NC 62A and later NC 8.  In the mid-1950s, NC 740 moved south from Badin Road to a new terminus with NC 27.  In the early 1980s, NC 740 was overlapped with NC 8 and extended  to its current northern terminus.

Junction list

See also
 Morrow Mountain State Park
 North Carolina Bicycle Route 6 - Concurrent with NC 740 from its southern terminus to Vickers Store Road

References

External links

 
 NCRoads.com: N.C. 740

740
Transportation in Stanly County, North Carolina